The 2017 Cal Poly Mustangs football team represented California Polytechnic State University in the 2017 NCAA Division I FCS football season. The Mustangs were led by ninth-year head coach Tim Walsh and played their home games at Alex G. Spanos Stadium. They were members of the Big Sky Conference. They finished the season 1–10, 1–7 in Big Sky play to finish in 12th place.

Schedule

Game summaries

Colgate

at San Jose State

at Northern Iowa

Northern Arizona

at Idaho State

at Southern Utah

Weber State

at UC Davis

Portland State

Sacramento State

at Northern Colorado

Ranking movements

References

Cal Poly
Cal Poly Mustangs football seasons
Cal Poly Mustangs football